"Deulgaon Mahi" is a village located in Deulgaon Raja taluka of Buldhana district, in state of Maharashtra. having six wards and 17 members' Grampanchayat body.

Some historical facts about Deulgaon Mahi:

1-The then taluka-Chikhli

2- Population in 1910 - 901

3-Total area -4725 acres

4-Revenue- 2921 / - Rs.

5-Native inhabitants of the village-Kasar (bronze metal workers)

6-Reasons why the old name of the village is "Deulgaon Pathan" or "Pathan Deulgaon"  From then on the name of the village was Deulgaon Pathan or Pathan Deulgaon which lasted till the near future.  From then on, the head of the village was "Patel" who was from this Pathan and there was also an office of Patel in "Garhi".  This has been the practice since before 1910 and it was followed in 1910.

7-There are two things about the word "Mahi" in the name Deulgaon Mahi:

i) Mahi was the name of a goddess to be worshiped.

ii) The name of the village was changed from "Pathan" to the comprehensive word "Mahi" meaning "mine".

8-Garhi: It was under the control of Pathan and Patel's office was in it.

9-Marathi School: There was a Marathi school for boys in the village since 1850 in which an average of 43 boys were studying every day in 1910. (ie there was not a single girl in these 43).  The name of the school proves that it was a boys' school from the beginning.  In the near future, the school is open to all.

10-Famous Places in the Village: i) Garhi ii) Branch Post Office iii) Opium & Liquor Shops iv) Post Bungalow

11-The weekly market day is Sunday from that time.

12-Famous product in the village: Blanket being made by "Dhangar community and till recently the village was famous for these blankets.

Demographics
As per 2011 census:
Deulgaon Mahi has 2146 families residing. The village has population of 10127.
Out of the population of 10127, 5248 are males while 4879 are females. 
Literacy rate of the village is 84.47%.
Average sex ratio of the village is 930 females to 1000 males. Average sex ratio of Maharashtra state is 929.

Geography, and transport
Deulgaon Mahi city is famous for "Khadakpurna dam" which is the source of water for different purposes for a number of villages around Deulgaon Mahi. It is a well-known marketplace for small villages around it.

Deulgaon Mahi is connected to almost all major cities like Jalna, Aurangabad, Buldana, Khamgaon, Amravati, Nagpur, Pune with a network of roads. deulgaon mahi situated on nagpur aurangabad 753A highway . and this village is well conncetd to main cities of maharashtra  ...

References

Villages in Buldhana district